Raoul Poulin (February 8, 1900 – October 23, 1975) was a Canadian politician, who represented the electoral district of Beauce in the House of Commons of Canada from 1949 to 1958. He was elected, and served the entirety of his term, as an independent MP.

He first entered politics as a Union Nationale member of the Legislative Assembly of Quebec, winning the provincial district of Beauce in the 1936 provincial election, but resigned less than two months into his term.

His brother, Georges-Octave Poulin, also later represented Beauce in the Legislative Assembly of Quebec.

References

External links

1900 births
1975 deaths
Members of the House of Commons of Canada from Quebec
Independent MPs in the Canadian House of Commons
Union Nationale (Quebec) MNAs
Physicians from Quebec
People from Beauce, Quebec